The Columbia Rhinos RFC is a rugby union club founded in 1967 that plays in Columbia, South Carolina. The team is a Division III club playing in the Carolinas Geographical Union of USA Rugby. The club was selected to host the 2006 and 2007 Division I, II & III National Rugby Club Playoffs as well as the 2006 National Women's Rugby Playoffs. The Club also hosts a rugby sevens tournament the first weekend of December to benefit local children's charities named the Grunk Sevens Tournament.

League

Playoffs

References

Sports in Columbia, South Carolina
Rugby union teams in Carolinas Geographical Union
Rugby union teams in South Carolina
Rugby clubs established in 1967
1967 establishments in South Carolina